Grace Greater Than All Our Sin is a well-known Christian hymn with lyrics by Julia H. Johnston and music by Daniel B. Towner.

Julia H. Johnston  (1849-1919), a Presbyterian teacher, author, and musician from Illinois, wrote the lyrics. Daniel B. Towner (1850-1919) wrote the music, naming the tune "Moody" because he worked as director of music at Moody Bible Institute. In 1911 the song was published the lyrics in Hymns Tried and True. The song describes the Christian doctrine of grace and justification by faith articulated in Paul's Letter to the Romans in Romans 5:1-2 and 14-16.

Lyrics
Grace Greater than Our Sin

Marvelous grace of our loving Lord,

Grace that exceeds our sin and our guilt!

Yonder on Calvary’s mount outpoured,

There where the blood of the Lamb was spilt.

Grace, grace, God’s grace,

Grace that will pardon and cleanse within;

Grace, grace, God’s grace,

Grace that is greater than all our sin!

References

American Christian hymns
20th-century hymns
1911 songs